Stealth Magazine was an independent hip-hop magazine from Sydney, Australia. Founded by Mark Pollard, it debuted in June 1999 with Arsonists on the cover. Its first three issues were zine-like in format (mostly black and white with a colour cover). In 2000 it went full colour and had a bonus CD attached to it and was quickly picked up for distribution by Tower Records worldwide (mag department now deceased).

The magazine's editorial content mostly focused on the independent hip-hop scenes around the world with the CD including music from Australia, United States, Canada, England, Switzerland and South Korea.

Stealth magazine ended publication in 2007.

Covers
Issue 1: The Arsonists
Issue 2: Saafir
Issue 3: Prince Paul
Issue 4: Celsius (Australia)
Issue 5: Esoteric, Boston Feature, Mnemonic Ascent (Australia)
Issue 6: KRS-One
Issue 7: De La Soul
Issue 8: Culture of Kings (Australia)
Issue 9: Style Wars
Issue 10: Gangstarr
Issue 11: DJ Bonez, Hyjak, Torcha (Australia)
Issue 12: Pete Rock and CL Smooth
Issue 13: Method Man and Redman
Issue 14: Def Wish Cast

References

External links
Official site

1999 establishments in Australia
2007 disestablishments in Australia
Australian hip hop
Music magazines published in Australia
Defunct magazines published in Australia
Hip hop magazines
Magazines established in 1999
Magazines disestablished in 2007
Magazines published in Sydney
Online magazines with defunct print editions
Online music magazines published in Australia